Gamelsby is a village near Aikton, Cumbria, England. It appears first in written records in 1305 as Gamelesby by Ayketon, and later as Gamelsby in 1332.

References

Villages in Cumbria
Allerdale